This is a list of the characters from the animated sitcom Home Movies that originally aired from 1999 to 2004 on UPN and later on Adult Swim.

Main characters 
Brendon Small (voiced by and named after Brendon Small) is the star of the show and writer/director/lead actor in most of his movies. He is an eight-year-old boy who acts out his anxieties and problems through filmmaking. He has had his trusty Camcorder since just after toddlerhood, and has been making films incessantly ever since, perhaps because he started around the time his parents got divorced. Though well-meaning, logical, and surprisingly witty, he is consistently dogged by apathy, oversight, and occasional egotism; he is usually surprised, confused or hurt when his work is criticized. Despite his questionable wisdom and intelligence in other parts of life, he is surprisingly knowledgeable about films and filmmaking; his first film was a homage to Easy Rider called Eazy Trikers. Brendon is apathetic toward his schoolwork and consistently gets bad grades, most likely because he is preoccupied with making movies. It has also been said by a few characters that he is quite feminine, as stated in the episodes "The Wedding" and "Shore Leave", as well as accidentally placing in a tape of him dressed like a girl in "Method of Acting". He has also shown an amazing talent for set design and sewing.

Coach John McGuirk (H. Jon Benjamin) is Brendon and Melissa's incompetent, acerbic soccer coach; an overweight, alcoholic Irish-American who constantly gives Brendon bad advice. McGuirk considers Brendon, Melissa and Jason his friends and will usually help them out or stick up for them even though he is often rude to them (especially Melissa). He often attempts to portray a father figure for Brendon, as in the show's finale.  Also, he frequently attempts to reach out to Lynch and Erik; however his misguided attempts often fail primarily due to his poor attitude. His actions often suggest that he is lonely and, on numerous occasions, attempts to organize group meet-ups with the other adult characters (episodes: Four's Company, Pizza Club) and acts desperate when they decline his invitations. He can also be a bully, especially to Lynch and Melissa, and also gives a very bad wedgie.  He often tries to impress or court Paula, Brendon's mother. McGuirk also admits that he hates soccer and has never played soccer, despite being the elementary school's soccer coach. In episode 22 "Class Trip", due to electrocution, a metal plate can be seen on the right side of his head. In "Therapy", he states he was in therapy once, and when Brendon asks why he responds, "there are certain things you have to do to re-enter society". This implies he has served jail time, confirmed in "Time to Pay the Price". In "Class Trip" McGuirk wrote on his résumé that he was a Gulf War vet. In "Breaking Up Is Hard To Do" it's implied that McGuirk has a secret life as a professional wrestler. Towards the end of the episode as Brendon and Paula talk, in the background on the TV there is a wrestling match on with a masked luchador that looks exactly like McGuirk with the Spanish translation of "the soccer coach" on his costumed chest. Whether or not this is true is still undetermined, though it is probably a joke as it is not mentioned in any other episodes.

Jason Penopolis (H. Jon Benjamin) is Brendon's friend and co-star who is noticeably more emotionally stunted, but can be much more aware of his surroundings and situations than others. Subtle irony throughout the series suggests that, while his parents are never introduced, they are wealthy, but never around or aware of Jason's pastimes, including the fact that he is always hanging out with Brendon and Melissa making films, though he himself is at least partially unaware that they tape them and while being friends with Brendon and Melissa, he never once told his parents about them. He has suffered dangerous and extreme attacks of sugar addiction on several occasions that Melissa usually helps him overcome. Jason also has numerous infections and diseases such as eczema. His feelings for Melissa are often very mixed—at one time, he told Brendon his view that she's a good person, but a terrible actress; at another time, he was more than eager to participate when Brendon suggested he and Melissa kiss. In "Fours Company" he tells Brendon he wants to marry her.  In "Definite Possible Murder" it is revealed that he is Greek. Jason's last name has been spelled out as Panopolis (in "The Art of the Sucker Punch" within the closed captions), Penopolis (in "Time to Pay the Price"), Popodopolis (in "History"), and Penopopolis (in "Focus Grill").  He also shows an amazing talent for sewing.

Melissa Robbins (Melissa Bardin Galsky) is Brendon's friend and co-star, who is often more sensible than Brendon or Jason. However, when it comes to very personal issues (such as her mother's whereabouts, family history and boyfriends), she becomes very frantic and overly sensitive. Melissa is also the daughter of a single father, Erik. At the beginning of season three she is shown to be a bit of a tomboy, but throughout season four she appears much more feminine. Melissa suffers from allergic bronchoconstriction if she eats kiwi, and carries an EpiPen as such. She was also, at one point, aquaphobic, but she overcame the fear when she rescued Coach McGuirk from drowning. She is a straight A student and often feels left out when she is not told about what the boys are planning.

Paula Small (Paula Poundstone for episodes 1 to 5, Janine Ditullio for remainder of series) is Brendon's single divorced mother, a (temporarily unemployed) creative writing teacher (apparently having taught in her younger days, as mentioned in Method of Acting) and author. She is usually supportive of Brendon's filmmaking, but sometimes sees it as a nuisance or unhealthy. She talks very frankly with Brendon about life issues, and they both make age-inappropriate jokes, thereby creating much more of a friendship between them than is usual. She is highly critical of Andrew's (Brendon's father's) relationship with Linda, frequently mocking the age disparity. Paula occasionally interferes with Brendon's movies, out of boredom or thanks to manipulation by Jason or Melissa. She frequently attempts to improve Brendon's apathy towards his schoolwork, to no avail. Paula performs terribly in pressure situations, such as job interviews and parent-teacher conferences.

Other characters

Recurring characters 
Mr. Lynch (Ron Lynch)—Brendon and Melissa's teacher who, later in the show, also becomes their interim principal. He is referred to by two different first names (Ronald and Donald) in the same episode ("Broken Dreams"). He is often at odds with McGuirk, who intensely dislikes Lynch but sometimes befriends him. Lynch is a somewhat pretentious person; he insists on pronouncing "Mexico" meh-hee-co. Lynch would like to believe that he is fluent in Spanish, but makes numerous errors in both grammar and vocabulary, particularly while intoxicated. He is the owner of numerous oddly named cats (because he is obviously single and their  names are: Anjelico, Fernilico, Moo-moo, Señor Twiginsky, and Sanchi-San, as seen the episode "Honkey Magoo"), and once suffered a breakdown when Brendon accidentally freed them all. Lynch also has a cat coffee mug and cat underwear, as seen in "Everybody's Entitled to My Opinion." A subtle, visual running gag in the last season is that he is secretly a cat-themed superhero, inspired from the previous season finale; this joke is usually relayed in the form of a newspaper headline in the background; the pictures accompanying the articles show a man in a cat costume very similar to the one Lynch dons in "Coffins and Cradles" and the cat costume is shown in a glass case in his office in "Everybody's Entitled to My Opinion".
Walter and Perry (H. Jon Benjamin and Brendon Small)—Two hyper best friends with high-pitched voices and matching attire. They are always together, usually holding hands, and are adamant about never leaving the other's side. Their relationship is a comedic tool, but treated gracefully by the show. It is also suggested in a DVD commentary track that they may be the only truly happy characters in the series.  Later in the series it is revealed that the two frequently engage in delinquent behavior, such  as cheating and shoplifting. Small commented that they were often unsure of which person portrayed which character. In the second episode of the fourth season ("Camp"), this dark side of Walter and Perry is further hinted at in a montage during which Coach McGuirk is hallucinating after eating poisonous plants.
 Duane (or Dwayne) (Brendon Small)—A metalhead of few words, whose band Scäb writes and performs the music for most of Brendon's movies. Duane has essentially mastered the guitar and is presumably a multi-talented showman (in "Director's Cut," Duane wrote and starred in a rock opera based on Kafka's The Metamorphosis which Melissa said may be "the best thing we've ever done," and in "Renaissance," he and his band show mastery of advanced pyrotechnics). His physical appearance is similar to that of Slash or Joey Ramone. Scäb's songs are actually played by the show's creator, Brendon Small. The spelling of his name changes throughout the series. Duane said he was 15 in "Guitarmageddon".
 Erik Robbins (Jonathan Katz)—Melissa's father, a real estate agent. Erik is one of Paula's few close friends, and occasionally hints at being attracted to her.  In several episodes he and McGuirk show signs of friendship, such as him helping McGuirk in looking for a new apartment in "Mortgages and Marbles" and reluctantly taking McGuirk with him to his journal-writing class in "Curses." He tells McGuirk that his ex-wife (Melissa's mother) reveals that she ran away with another man. When Erik attempts to begin dating again in the fourth-season episode "Curses," Melissa objects and moves out. Erik is known for his wise-guy persona and constantly makes inappropriate jokes, which Melissa sees as alternately hilarious and embarrassing. Melissa also says he buys wine coolers for the teenagers in town, claiming "they'll just buy it themselves in a few years;" Jason later offers the others wine coolers that Melissa's dad bought him ("Everybody's Entitled to My Opinion").
 Fenton Mewly (Sam Seder)—Age 8. A spoiled, annoying classmate with the tendency to call Brendon "Bren-Bren," and ask to be in one of his "video-films." His personality changes dramatically after McGuirk scolds Fenton for his poor treatment of his mother at his 8th birthday party, and in later episodes is seen as oddly obedient and clingy to her. Brendon once stayed at Fenton's house for the weekend in "Shore Leave"; the experience was extremely torturous and Brendon at one point feared for his own life and filmed himself hiding in the closet à la Blair Witch. Then Brendon went to the bathroom and accidentally filmed Fenton's mother getting out of the shower, also shaving, which prompted Fenton to attack Brendon. McGuirk later gets his hand on the copy of the videotape and calls to register a domain name, fentonsnakedmom.com, and middleagednakedmoms.com only to find it is taken. Fenton deeply disdains Brendon's movies, and enjoys berating him with film theory criticisms, although this has more to do with his jealousy of not being in them than the actual films themselves. In the episode 'Heart Smashers', Brendon 'breaks-up' with Fenton, with Fenton taking great offense and breaking-up with Brendon as well (only Jason realizing the parallels to Fenton and Brendon's spat to a couple breaking up.) Later in the episode, however, he 'gets back together' with Fenton, in the same couple-like manner, because he almost missed having the constant annoyance.
 Josie Small (Loren Bouchard)—Brendon's baby sister. It is revealed late in the series that she is adopted.
 Andrew Small (Louis C.K.)—Brendon's estranged father, a lawyer. He is 11 years older than his second wife, Linda (the two marry in "The Wedding," the season two finale). He and Brendon are re-acquainted in Season 2 in "Dad," and an initially tense relationship ultimately shows them as being very attached and fond of each other, despite the awkwardness caused by Andrew's fiancée Linda, which the trio try to deal with through 'gentle talk' in "Therapy." Coach McGuirk, after being excluded from Andrew and Brendon's pizza club, scolds Andrew and competes with him for Brendon's affections in "Pizza Club." However, he seems to disappear from Brendon's life and was not present for the birth of his child by his second wife Linda in the third-season finale "Coffins and Cradles," because he was on a business trip resulting in Linda staying with Paula during the final days of her pregnancy. Despite being featured in four episodes in the second season, he appears only once in the third season ("My Cheatin' Heart") and is not in any season four episodes.

Minor characters 
 Linda Small (Laura Silverman)—Brendon's attractive, snippy stepmother. She often does volunteer work, but most likely for a sense of superiority.  She later becomes pregnant with Andrew's second biological child and goes into labor on Halloween night. Brendon becomes her birthing partner but leaves when she becomes too moody due to her labor pains. He does come back later to videotape the birth. Andrew is not around for the birth; the sex of the baby is assumed to be a boy as Stephanie (Paula's friend) considers calling it Jesus.
 Nurse Kirkman (Jen Kirkman)—The attractive new school nurse who Coach McGuirk tries unsuccessfully to court. Jason is infatuated with her, and attacks McGuirk after he mentions the latter's advances.
 Arnold Lindenson (Andy Kindler)—Paula's expressive and oddly energetic boss. He is quite tactless; he laughingly denied Paula when she asked for a raise, and assumed she would try to kill him when he fired her. Apathetic and carefree, but is oblivious about how rude he is being to others. He initially mistook Brendon for being Paula's daughter rather than her son for reasons unknown. He has a good side, however, and offered Paula her job back on the day of her ex-husband's wedding (which she accepted).
 Shannon (Emo Philips)—Age 9. A strangely friendly bully who initially beats up Brendon, but later befriends him.  He shows contempt for teachers and authority figures in general, such as breaking into Mr. Lynch's car and stealing all of his Frank Sinatra music.  He coerces Brendon into giving him the lead role in the musical "Bye Bye Greasy" and shows a remarkable talent for acting and singing.  It is from Shannon's yard where Brendon originally steals the recurring lawn gnome, out of revenge for getting tricked by Shannon.
 Stephanie (Kelly Kimball)—Paula's attractive but flaky friend who is in the midst of a divorce in the first season ("Law and Boarders"). She twice tries to seduce McGuirk, first in "The Wedding" and later in "Coffins and Cradles," though to no avail thanks to his self-sabotaging personality and a mild heart attack.
 The Adelbergs (both Brendon Small), a presumably foreign family with a drawly East Slavic accent. While an expansive family can be seen in "The Wizard's Baker", only two members can be seen as recurring: Junior, a schoolmate of Brendon, and Ken, Junior's father.  Ken's wife was heard off screen as a phone voice in the episode "Curses", where she was also voiced by Small and spoke in the same accent as her son and husband. Junior has appeared in one of Brendon's Starboy films, his school play, and his focus group. He is a Skunk Scout, and once convinced Brendon to join at a moment when Brendon was trying to distance himself from his film "The Wizard's Baker." Ken is a recurring adult character; he is constantly seen changing jobs, which have included hotelier ("Class Trip"), an agent for Big Brothers ("Dad"), a domain name registrar ("Shore Leave"), a student, a flower delivery man and a butcher ("Identifying a Dead Body").  Ken Adelberg is also credited as director in the credits of All That Violence in the episode "Everybody's Entitled to My Opinion".
 Loni (Laura Silverman), a red-haired girl in Brendon's school presumably around age 9. The only episode she played a prominent role in was "Yoko", in which she became Brendon's girlfriend after meeting at a camping trip. She leaves him for her ex-boyfriend, Mitch (Mitch Hedberg) the fifth grader. In other episodes, she is only shown as a background character.
 Clarice (whose boyfriend calls her Li'l Mama) (Valerie Kappa)—Coffee-house employee. She and Coach McGuirk work together at a coffee shop in "Class Trip." She is the girlfriend of Duane's rival Jimmy Monet. She is severely Obsessive-compulsive. It's also implied she may have sociopathic tendencies, as she glibly remarks that her father took her stereo after she set some paint on fire and cheerfully recounts seeing animals dying on her farm. She often speaks for long stretches of time, usually starting with one topic and then segueing into different things that have little to nothing to do with her original topic of conversation. At the end of "Guitarmageddon", she approached to Duane to agree that he should have beaten Jimmy Monet and impresses him with her knowledge of guitar fundamentals, and the pair are last seen going out to dinner together (her talkative nature also seeming to complement Duane's naturally quiet nature).
 Jimmy Monet (Will Lebow), Duane's extremely talented yet full-of-himself rival, he won the guitar contest known as "Guitarmageddon" in the episode of the same name.  Jimmy dated Clarice, and has a group of unnamed followers who presumably worship his guitar skills.  His appearance is thought to be a nod to original Van Halen singer, David Lee Roth.
 Trudy Mulley (Paula Plum), mother of Fenton Mulley. She is a woman around age 35 who has the essence of a 1950s housewife who tries to do everything right. She only had a prominent role in two episodes: "The Party" and "Shore Leave". In the episodes "Curses" and "Honkey Magoo", she is shown with Fenton in crowd scenes and has no lines.
 Cynthia (Jen Kirkman)—Choreographer for Duane's band who Brendon has a crush on. Brendon takes her on a date to Jason's country club in "Impressions," but she invites Duane and his band members along. He eventually confesses his feelings in a disastrously public way at a battle of the bands in her last appearance in the second-season episode "Pizza Club."
 Drill Sergeant/Instructor (Brendon Small)—A middle-aged man, who dresses and acts like a Drill Sergeant, appears in episode #311, "Broken Dreams," as a Lifeguard Instructor, as well as in episode #409, "Those Bitches Tried to Cheat Me," as a DMV Instructor.

Guest appearances 
 Todd Barry as The Clerk in "Psycho-Delicate"
 David Cross as Guy in Grocery Store in "Brendon's Choice"
 They Might Be Giants as the counselors in "Camp" (John Flansburgh as Mike and John Linnell as Miguel)
 Mitch Hedberg as The Pet Eulogist in "Brendon Gets Rabies," Mitch in "Yoko," Cop in "Law and Boarder," and Anger Management Counselor in "Brendon's Choice"
 Tom Kenny as Doctor in "Coffins and Cradles"
 Eugene Mirman as Eugene in "Yoko" and "The Wizard's Baker", a creepy Russian boy who is often the only one who finds anything he does to be funny (such as peeing in Coach McGuirk's canteen in "Yoko", or in a punchbowl in a background shot of "The Wizard's Baker").
 Patton Oswalt as Helmet in "Renaissance", a Renaissance Fair enthusiast who gets on Melissa's nerves.
 Mary Lynn Rajskub as Penny in "Those Bitches Tried to Cheat Me", a 5th grade girl whom Jason has a crush on.
 Ian Roberts as Tom Wilsonberg in "Stow-A-Way"
 Maria Bamford as Journal Instructor and Joviana in "Curses"

See also 
 List of Home Movies episodes

References 

Characters
Home Movies